Pseudopostega suffuscula is a moth of the family Opostegidae. It was described by Donald R. Davis and Jonas R. Stonis, 2007. It is known from the provinces of Salta and Tucumán in northern Argentina.

The length of the forewings is 2.4–3 mm. Adults have been recorded from November to January.

Etymology
The species name is derived from the Latin suffusculus (meaning brownish) in reference to the characteristic cream to light brownish color of the forewings of this species.

References

Opostegidae
Moths described in 2007